Lt. Gen. Sein Win is a Burmese politician and lieutenant general in the Myanmar Armed Forces who served as the Minister of Defence of Myanmar from 24 August 2015 to 1 February 2021.

Early life and education
Sein Win was born on 24 July 1956 to Chit Maung and Daw Kyi in the village of Khabaungkyaing in Taze Township, Sagaing Division, Burma (now Sagaing Region, Myanmar). Sein Win graduated from the 54th intake of the Officers Training School, Bahtoo.

Career
He then headed the newly created Air Defense Office under the Ministry of Defense in 2002, long before becoming a defense minister.

Previously he was Chief of Staff of the Bureau of Air Defence of the Myanmar Army. He was appointed as Minister of Defence by military officials on 24 August 2015, along with the Minister of Border Affairs.

In his capacity as Defense Minister, Sein Win also attended occasional regional meetings and might therefore be able to potentially relate to other Southeast Asian governments on relevant issues.

Personal life
Sein Win is married to Myint Myint Aye, and has 3 daughters, Shwe Sin, Ngwe Sin, and Kyi Sin.

References

Burmese military personnel
Living people
Defence ministers of Myanmar
1956 births
Specially Designated Nationals and Blocked Persons List
Officers Training School, Bahtoo alumni
Individuals related to Myanmar sanctions